Clara Averbuck Gomes  (born 26 May 1979) is a Brazilian writer.

Life and career
Averbuck was born in Porto Alegre. Her father is the musician Hique Gomez, from the duo Tangos & Tragédias. She attended journalism classes at the Pontifical Catholic University of Rio Grande do Sul but did not finish the course.

She began writing in 1998 for the e-zine CardosOnline, together with Daniel Galera, André Czarnobai, Daniel Pellizzari and others, and also for several blogs. She moved to São Paulo in 2001; her first book Máquina de Pinball was published the following year. The book was adapted into the 2007 film  Nome Próprio (Camila Jam) , directed by Murilo Salles and starred by Leandra Leal; Averbuck wrote the screenplay. 

Averbuck also collaborated for the websites Vírgula and R7.

Published works

2002- Máquina de Pinball
2003- Das Coisas Esquecidas Atrás da Estante
2004- Vida de Gato
2008- Nossa Senhora da Pequena Morte (with Eva Uviedo)
2012- Cidade Grande no Escuro
2014- Eu Quero Ser Eu
2016- Toureando o Diabo (with Eva Uviedo)

References

External links
Official site 

 1979 births
 Brazilian women writers
People from Porto Alegre
Living people